The Burnside Bridgehead is a development project at the northeast end of the Burnside Bridge in Portland, Oregon's Kerns neighborhood, in the United States.

The site includes:
 Yard, a black 21-story apartment building completed in 2017
 Fair-Haired Dumbbell, two brightly colored connected six-story towers, completed in 2017
 Blake McFall Company Building; historic, home to Autodesk
 Slate building, 10 stories, home to CENTRL Office
 Eastside Exchange; historic
 Union Arms Apartments; historic
 Sideyard, designed by Skylab; 4 stories of cross-laminated timber, completed in 2020

 Frigidaire Building

References

Kerns, Portland, Oregon